The men's 5000 meter at the 2023 KNSB Dutch Single Distance Championships took place in Heerenveen at the Thialf ice skating rink on Friday 3 February 2023. There were 16 participants. Patrick Roest, Marcel Bosker, and Jorrit Bergsma qualified for the 2023 ISU World Speed Skating Championships in Heerenveen.

Statistics

Result

Referee: Bert Timmerman.  Assistant: Frank Spoel.  Starter: Wim van Biezen. 

Source:

Draw

References

Single Distance Championships
2023 Single Distance